Bruce Fraser may refer to:

 Bruce Fraser, 1st Baron Fraser of North Cape (1888–1981), British admiral during World War II, Admiral of the Fleet
 Sir Bruce Fraser (civil servant) (1910–1993), British civil servant and humorist
 Bruce Fraser (author) (1954–2006), author that specialized in digital color technology
 Bruce Fraser (basketball) (born 1964), American basketball coach
 Bruce Fraser (athlete) (born 1946), English athlete